Irina Mushailova; born 6 January 1967 in Krasnodar) is a retired Russian athlete who specialized in long jump and triple jump.

International competitions

Personal bests
Long jump - 7.20 m (1994)
Triple jump - 14.79 m (1993)

References

1967 births
Living people
Russian female long jumpers
Russian female triple jumpers
Olympic female long jumpers
Olympic athletes of the Unified Team
Athletes (track and field) at the 1992 Summer Olympics
Goodwill Games medalists in athletics
Competitors at the 1994 Goodwill Games
World Athletics Championships athletes for Russia
World Athletics Championships medalists
Russian Athletics Championships winners